
Armbruster may refer to the following:

People 
 Charlie Armbruster (1880–1964), U.S. baseball player
 Christian H. Armbruster (1921–1986), New York politician
 David Armbruster (1917–1993), U.S. politician, member of the Ohio House of Representatives
 David Armbruster (1890–1985), U.S. swim coach
 Eugene Armbruster (1865–1943), German-born U.S. illustrator and photographer
 Harry Armbruster (also known as "Army" Armbruster; 1882–1953), U.S. baseball player
 Jeff Armbruster (born ?), U.S. politician, member of the Ohio Senate
 Jen Armbruster (born 1975), American goalball player
 Kurt Armbruster (born 1934), Swiss footballer
 Peter Armbruster (born 1931), German physicist
 Robert Armbruster (1897–1994), U.S. composer, conductor, pianist, and songwriter
 Vic Armbruster (1902–1984), Australian rugby player
 Daniel Armbruster, member of rock band Joywave
Fictional
 Brad J. Armbruster, also known as "Ace", from the G.I. Joe franchise (see Ace (G.I. Joe))
 John Armbruster Craig from Space Relations

Places 
 Armbruster Rocks, Antarctic exposed rocks on the west side of Wright Island

Other 
 Armbruster's wolf (Canis armbrusteri), an extinct species of canid which was endemic to North America

See also 
 Armbrust

German-language surnames
Surnames of German origin